Woodcroft College is an independent, private Anglican, co-educational day school for students from ELC to Year 12, located on Bains Road in the southern Adelaide suburb of Morphett Vale, South Australia. Despite being named for the southern Adelaide suburb of Woodcroft, the College is situated in the suburb of Morphett Vale. Founded in 1989, Woodcroft College celebrated its Silver Jubilee in 2014 after 25 years of operation.

Woodcroft College is a vibrant and modern coeducational school with well-equipped facilities set in spacious grounds. Established in 1989 in Adelaide, South Australia, the College aims to provide students from Early Learning to Year 12 with an excellent, all-round education in a Christian environment.

The Junior School runs on the IB Primary Years Programme (PYP). Year 11 and 12 students are offered two curriculum pathways; the South Australian Certificate of Education (SACE), SACE combined with Vocational Education and Training (VET).

The broad curriculum is designed to challenge students to think progressively and courageously, and to strive for high standards and personal success. Outside the classroom, the extra-curricular program gives students many different opportunities to follow their interests and develop new skills. From sport, to performing arts, clubs and activities.

With a strong International Program, the school welcomes students from overseas who wish to study in Australia. The school can provide opportunities for full-time study or shorter-term Study Abroad and Study Tour options. This is complemented by the Woodcroft Intensive School of English (WISE) on campus to help full time students achieve the level of English skills necessary to be successful in their studies.

Woodcroft College has a strong sense of community and purpose. With passionate and professional staff who are committed to developing each student as a successful and contributing, well-rounded member of society.

Early Learning Centre

The ELC is guided by the IB Primary Years Program and the Early Years Learning Framework. Educators are also guided by the Reggio Emilia philosophy.

Early childhood is a time for play, curiosity, imagination, discovery and adventure. The ELC staff recognise that all children learn in different ways and at different paces. The unique tailored learning method is designed to suit each individual child. Through a balanced mix of play-based learning and intentional teaching, learning potential is maximised and children are able to develop a sense of belonging, being and becoming.

Junior School

From their first day in Woodcroft College Junior School, children are encouraged to ask questions, reflect on their learning, explore and research, and to take action through the IB Primary Years Program.

The curriculum will cover key learning areas and provide a solid foundation to support children in their learning throughout their educational journey from Reception to Year 12. Teachers are supported in every classroom by Education Support Officers with subjects such as language, art, PE and music taught by specialist teachers.

Middle School

Woodcroft College Middle School provides an environment where students will be challenged to achieve their best within a safe, caring and inclusive community. With outstanding pastoral care in place and a focus on positive values, the aim is to develop young people for academic, emotional and social success.

One of the strengths of Middle School is the opportunity for students to develop their passions through the subjects offered along with the many extra-curricular options including sport, music, performing arts, clubs and leadership opportunities.

Senior School

Senior School at Woodcroft College is the space and place for students to flourish in their individual strengths as they prepare to pursue their chosen pathway in life after school.

With a range of subject choices, the curriculum is broad and challenging. From core subjects and electives in Year 10 to the choice of over 40 compulsory and elective subjects as part of the South Australian Certificate of Education (SACE) and Vocational Education and Training. Woodcroft College offers a wide range of subjects to cater to emerging interests and the development of new skills.

College emblem and colours
The Woodcroft College emblem has individual elements that represent a particular value: an empty cross as a sign for hope; a serpent as a reminder of faith; a heart-shaped shield as a token of love; and a 'W' inside the cross representing the Woodcroft College Community.

The Woodcroft College colours of navy blue and gold are associated with the school's patron saint, Hilda of Whitby, while the red is a liturgical (seasonal) colour of the Christian churches.

Sub-schools system
Woodcroft College is divided into four sub-schools each with their own heads, classes, and subject teachers. The sub-schools, their current Heads of School and year levels are as follows:

Early Learning Centre: N Olrich (3 and 4 year olds)
Junior School: A Mikulcic  (Reception - Year 6)
Middle School: T Charlton  (Year 7 - Year 9)
Senior School: A Griffiths (Year 10 - Year 12)

House system
Upon commencement at Woodcroft College, each student is assigned to one of the four houses with all other members of a family being assigned to the same house. The House System acts as the focus for families, sport and student leadership. In the Junior School, the houses support sporting, cultural and co-curricular activities and its students compete within their classes and year levels earning points for their house in the annual Junior School Sports Day situated on campus. In the Middle and Senior Schools, the houses compete against each other in the annual Swimming Carnival and Athletics Carnival held off campus. Middle School students also compete in house activities during the term. The names of the four houses originated from famous influences and areas situated near or around the College.

Facilities
Woodcroft College offers a variety of facilities, all set in landscaped grounds with modern buildings and playing fields. Campus facilities include:
 Large multi-purpose Primary Hall: seating capacity for 350 people with retractable seating
 Small lecture theatre for various uses: seats up to 100 and is equipped with lectern and AV facilities.
 Innovation Centre including CAD and CAM, 3D printers and CNC router
 Modern Hospitality & Skills Centre
 Home Economics classrooms: two for Food Technology and two for Textiles Technology
 Science laboratories
 Visual Art classrooms
 Fully equipped classrooms
 Private music tuition rooms and larger rooms for ensemble work
 Extensive Middle & Senior Schools Resource Centre and smaller Junior School Library
 Gymnasium: includes International Standard Basketball, Netball and Volleyball Courts; practice courts for basketball, netball, volleyball and badminton; and male and female change rooms
 Outdoor sports courts
 Two large ovals with facilities for football, soccer, cricket and athletics
 Large "College Green" forming a central 'hub' for the school
 Medical and First Aid facilities: Nurse on site

See also
List of schools in South Australia

References

External links
 Woodcroft College Website
 Association of Independent Schools of South Australia

Anglican primary schools in Adelaide
Anglican secondary schools in Adelaide